The 1939–40 football season was the 13th season of the Latvian Virsliga. It was also the last season of football in independent Latvia before its annexation by the Soviet Union (the last matches of the season were played with Latvia already being part of the USSR).

Competition modus

Every team played two games against each other team, one at home and one away. Teams received two points for a win and one point for a draw.

Team changes to 1938-39
16.JAPSK were relegated to Zemgale league after losing additional matches for the 6-8th places in the previous Virsliga season against US and Hakoah Riga. They were replaced by the winner of the promotion battles VEF Riga who beat out Venstpils Spars in the decisive match for a Virsliga berth.

Season overview
The battle for the title was mostly between the defending champions Olimpija Liepāja and the former champions RFK. Until midseason Hakoah Riga also kept up in the race but it fell back later in the season. Olimpija squad suffered a serious loss when five of its footballers were disqualified because of problems with discipline by the club for a longer period. Those included leading players like Roberts Heiblihs, Pēteris Jurčenko and Fricis Laumanis. Eventually the disqualification of Laumanis was shortened but both Jurčenko and Heiblihs missed out nearly the entire season. In their absence the young forward from Kuldīga Bērziņš became the club's leading goalscorer.

Final classification

Top goalscorers
15 goals
  Fricis Kaņeps (RFK)
  Aleksandrs Vanags (ASK)

13 goals
  Vaclavs Borduško (ASK)

12 goals
  J.Bērziņš (Olimpija Liepāja)

10 goals
  Edgars Klāvs (US)
  Ēriks Raisters (RFK)

9 goals
  Zamuels Garbers (Hakoah)

8 goals
  Jānis Rozītis (VEF)
  Voldemārs Apsēns (Olimpija Liepāja)

7 goals
  Ernests Ziņģis (Olimpija Liepāja)

Champion squad

References and sources
Latvijas futbola vēsture by Miķelis Rubenis, Rīga, 2001

Latvian Higher League seasons
1939 in Latvian football
1940 in Latvian football
Latvia